The siege of Van occurred in 1548 when Suleiman the Magnificent attacked Persia in his second campaign of the Ottoman-Safavid War (1532–1555).

The city of Van, which has long been strategic in Eastern Anatolia, was surrounded, put under siege, and bombarded. On this campaign, Suleiman was accompanied by the French ambassador Gabriel de Luetz. Gabriel de Luetz was able to give decisive military advice to Suleiman, as when he advised on artillery placement during the siege.

References

1548 in Asia
Conflicts in 1548
History of Van, Turkey
Suleiman the Magnificent
Battles involving Safavid Iran
Van 1548